The Croatia–Serbia football rivalry is a football rivalry between the national football teams of Croatia and Serbia. It is considered to be one of the most hostile in world football due to their complex political history stemming from World War II and the breakup of Yugoslavia. The two rivals had previously both represented the Yugoslavia national football team, and contributed the bulk of the teams footballers during almost 70 years of its existence. Both national sides are governed by UEFA in Europe, in addition to FIFA during their international matches.

History

Origins
The two national teams first encounter occurred in the semi-final of the one-off 1945 Yugoslav Football Tournament. The Home Championship/Victory International style competition was played amongst six federal republics, one autonomous region and the Yugoslav People's Army team to mark the end of World War II. Serbia featured a team almost entirely composed of Red Star Belgrade players whilst Dinamo Zagreb was the primary contributor to the Croatian line-up. The match was played without incident in Belgrade's 20th October Stadium with Serbia defeating Croatia 3–1, and progressing to the final where they beat the Army team 1–0. These matches are not formally recognised by FIFA as full internationals as this was a domestic tournament organised by the Football Association of Yugoslavia.

On 13 May 1990, Dinamo Zagreb hosted Red Star Belgrade at Stadion Maksimir in the Yugoslav First League. It was just weeks after Croatia's first election, in the middle of ethnic tensions in Yugoslavia. The game was interrupted after only ten minutes, as Dinamo's ultras Bad Blue Boys and Red Star's ultras Delije started the infamous riot. The incident remained remembered for Dinamo's Zvonimir Boban kicking a Militia officer, after seeing him beating a Dinamo ultra. Subsequently, Boban was suspended for six months by the Football Association of Yugoslavia and expelled from the squad for the 1990 FIFA World Cup.

On 3 June 1990, a friendly match between Yugoslavia and the Netherlands took place at Stadion Maksimir and was the last friendly before the 1990 FIFA World Cup. The crowd of 20,000 booed the Yugoslav national anthem "Hey, Slavs". Fans cheered for the Netherlands, heckling the Yugoslav team and their manager Ivica Osim. Many Dutch flags were also seen in the crowd, owing to their similarity to the Croatian tricolour. The match was the last Yugoslavia match to be played at the stadium. On 17 October of that same year, Croatia played its first international match of the modern era at the stadium against the United States.

Euro 2000 qualifying
The first official international encounter after 54 years between Croatia and Serbia (the latter playing as FR Yugoslavia), occurred on 18 August 1999 at the Red Star Stadium in Belgrade, as part of UEFA Euro 2000 qualifying. The match ended as a goalless draw. The match remained memorable for power outage at the stadium that allegedly intimidated the Croatian players. The return game at Stadion Maksimir in Zagreb was played on 9 October 1999 and it was a decisive match for Croatia, as they needed a victory to qualify for the tournament. Ten minutes into the game, Aljoša Asanović passed the ball to Davor Šuker who took a shot, but Ivica Kralj rebounded it. Even though the ball was over the goal line, Spanish referee José María García-Aranda ruled the goal out. In 20th minute, Alen Bokšić opened the scoreline. However, Yugoslavia came from behind with goals by Predrag Mijatović and Dejan Stanković in 26th and 31st respective minute. In a duel between Zoran Mirković and Robert Jarni, the former grabbed the latter by the genitalia and received a straight red card. The incident motivated Croatia even more resulting in Mario Stanić's equalizer in 47th minute. The third goal that would've taken Croatia to the tournament never came, as Josip Šimić who was substituted for Bokšić wasted the best chance the team had. The elimination saw Croatia enter a phrase of crisis that lasted for eight years.

2014 World Cup qualification
Croatia and now independent Serbia met again 14 years later in the 2014 FIFA World Cup qualification. The first match was played on 22 March 2013 at Stadion Maksimir and ended up as a 2–0 victory for Croatia following goals by Mario Mandžukić and Ivica Olić. The return game was played on 6 September 2013 at the Red Star Stadium and ended up as a 1–1 draw. Croatia took the lead after Mandžukić scored in 53rd minute but Serbia equalized in 66th minute through Aleksandar Mitrović. In 80th minute, Josip Šimunić brutally tackled Miralem Sulejmani as the latter was running all by himself towards the Croatia's goal. As a result, he received a straight red card. Croatia finished the qualification as the group runners-up and went on to beat Iceland 2–0 on aggregate in the play-offs. Serbia ended up third in the group with three points less than Croatia and subsequently not qualifying for the tournament.

Euro 2020
On 30 November 2019, a draw for UEFA Euro 2020 placed Croatia in the same group as the winner of the qualifying play-off Path C. Having topped their group in the 2018–19 UEFA Nations League C and failing to qualify through the regular qualifiers, Serbia secured their spot in the play-offs. They defeated Norway 2–1 after extra time in the play-off semi-final, but eventually lost the final to Scotland after a penalty shoot-out that saw Scotland win 5–4. At the tournament, it was beating Scotland 3–1 that qualified Croatia for the Round of 16.

Matches

Statistics

Top scorers
 Mario Mandžukić (2 goals)
 Alen Bokšić (1 goal) 
 Predrag Mijatović (1 goal)
 Aleksandar Mitrović (1 goal)
 Ivica Olić (1 goal)
 Mario Stanić (1 goal)
 Dejan Stanković (1 goal)

Comparison in major international tournaments
 Key
 Denotes which team finished better in that particular competition.

See also
Croatia–Serbia basketball rivalry
Croatia–Serbia relations
Albania–Serbia football rivalry
Croatia–Italy football rivalry

References

Croatia national football team rivalries
Serbia national football team rivalries
International association football rivalries
Croatia–Serbia relations